Cornelia Sirch (born 23 October 1966) is a former East German backstroke swimmer. She competed at the 1988 Summer Olympics in three events and won two bronze medals in the 100 m and 200 m backstroke and a gold medal in the 4 × 100 m medley relay, in which she swam in a preliminary round. In 1982 she was named Swimming World's European Swimmer of the Year, after winning 200 m backstroke at the World Championships in Guayaguil in a world record time of 2:09.91, becoming the first woman to dip under 2 minutes 10 seconds.

Between 1983 and 1987 she won six gold and two silver medals at European championships. She retired shortly after the 1988 Olympics and later had serious health problems, which she attributed to doping she had to take as part of the East German training system. Her European Swimmer of the Year title was vacated in 2013, due to her participation in the doping program.

References

1966 births
Living people
Sportspeople from Erfurt
Female backstroke swimmers
Olympic swimmers of East Germany
Swimmers at the 1988 Summer Olympics
Olympic bronze medalists for East Germany
Olympic gold medalists for East Germany
World record setters in swimming
Olympic bronze medalists in swimming
Medalists at the 1988 Summer Olympics
East German female freestyle swimmers
World Aquatics Championships medalists in swimming
European Aquatics Championships medalists in swimming
German sportspeople in doping cases
Doping cases in swimming
Olympic gold medalists in swimming